Giuseppe Tomasi di Lampedusa, 11th Prince of Lampedusa, 12th Duke of Palma, GE (23 December 1896 – 23 July 1957) was an Italian writer and the last Prince of Lampedusa. He is most famous for his only novel, Il Gattopardo (first published posthumously in 1958), which is set in his native Sicily during the Risorgimento. A taciturn and solitary man, he spent a great deal of his time reading and meditating, and used to say of himself "I was a boy who liked solitude, who preferred the company of things to that of people."

Biography
Tomasi was born in Palermo to Giulio Maria Tomasi, Prince of Lampedusa, Duke of Palma di Montechiaro, Baron of Torretta, and Grandee of Spain (1868–1934), and Beatrice Mastrogiovanni Tasca Filangieri di Cutò (1870–1946). He became an only child after the death (from diphtheria) in 1897 of his sister Stefania. He was very close to his mother, a strong personality who influenced him a great deal, especially because his father was rather cold and detached. As a child he studied in their grand house in Palermo with a tutor (including the subjects of literature and English), with his mother (who taught him French) and with a grandmother who read him the novels of Emilio Salgari. In the little theatre of the house in Santa Margherita di Belice, where he spent long vacations, he first saw a performance of Hamlet, performed by a company of travelling players. His cousin was Fulco di Verdura.

Beginning in 1911 he attended the liceo classico in Rome and later in Palermo. He moved definitively to Rome in 1915 and enrolled in the faculty of jurisprudence. However that year he was drafted into the army, fought in the lost battle of Caporetto, and was taken prisoner by the Austro-Hungarian Army. He was held in a PoW camp in Hungary, but succeeded in escaping and returning to Italy. After being mustered out of the army as a lieutenant, he returned to Sicily, alternately resting there and travelling with his mother, and continuing his studies of foreign literature. It was during this time that he first drafted in his mind the ideas for his future novel The Leopard. Originally his plan was to have the entire novel occur over the course of one day, similar to the famous modernist novel by James Joyce, Ulysses.

In 1932 in Riga he married the daughter of Alice Barbi, Alexandra von Wolff-Stomersee (1894–1982), nicknamed "Licy", a Baltic German noblewoman and a student of psychoanalysis. The marriage ceremony was celebrated in the Orthodox Annunciation of Our Most Holy Lady Church in Riga. They first lived with Tomasi's mother in Palermo, but the incompatibility between the two women soon drove Licy back to Riga.

In 1934 Tomasi di Lampedusa's father died, and he inherited his princely title. He was briefly called back to arms in 1940, but, as owner of a hereditary agricultural estate, was soon sent home to take care of its affairs. He and his mother ultimately took refuge in Capo d'Orlando, where he was reunited with Licy. They survived the war, but their palace in Palermo did not.

After his mother died in 1946, Tomasi returned to live with his wife in Palermo. In 1953 he began to spend time with a group of young intellectuals, one of whom was Gioacchino Lanza Tomasi, a cousin, with whom he developed such a close relationship that, the following year, he legally adopted him.

Tomasi di Lampedusa was often the guest of his cousin, the poet Lucio Piccolo, with whom he travelled in 1954 to San Pellegrino Terme to attend a literary awards ceremony, where he met, among others, Eugenio Montale and Maria Bellonci. It is said that it was upon returning from this trip that he commenced writing Il Gattopardo (The Leopard), which was finished in 1956. During his life, the novel was rejected by the two publishers to whom Tomasi submitted it.

In 1957 Tomasi di Lampedusa was diagnosed with lung cancer; he died on 23 July in Rome. Following a requiem in the Basilica del Sacro Cuore di Gesù in Rome, he was buried three days later in the Capuchin cemetery of Palermo. His novel was published the year after his death.   had sent it to the writer Giorgio Bassani, who brought it to the attention of the Feltrinelli publishing house. Il Gattopardo was quickly recognized as a great work of Italian literature. In 1959 Tomasi di Lampedusa was posthumously awarded the prestigious Strega Prize for the novel.

Works

Il Gattopardo follows the family of its title character, the Sicilian nobleman Don Fabrizio Corbera, Prince of Salina, through the events of the Risorgimento. Perhaps the most memorable line in the book is spoken by Don Fabrizio's nephew, Tancredi, urging unsuccessfully that Don Fabrizio abandon his allegiance to the disintegrating Kingdom of the Two Sicilies and ally himself with Giuseppe Garibaldi and the House of Savoy: "Unless we ourselves take a hand now, they'll foist a republic on us. If we want things to stay as they are, things will have to change", an approach to politics that has become known as the di Lampedusa strategy.

The title is rendered in English as The Leopard, but the Italian word gattopardo refers to the American ocelot or to the African serval. Il gattopardo may be a reference to a wildcat that was hunted to extinction in Italy in the mid-19th century – just as Don Fabrizio was dryly contemplating the indolence and decline of the Sicilian aristocracy.

In 1963 Il Gattopardo was made into a film, directed by Luchino Visconti and starring Burt Lancaster, Alain Delon, and Claudia Cardinale; it won the Palme d'Or at the Cannes Film Festival.

Tomasi also wrote some lesser-known works: I racconti (Stories, first published 1961), including the novella The Professor and the Siren, Le lezioni su Stendhal (Lessons on Stendhal, privately published in 1959, published in book form in 1977), and Invito alle lettere francesi del Cinquecento (Introduction to sixteenth-century French literature, first published 1970). In 2010, a collection of his letters were published in English as Letters from London and Europe. His perceptive commentaries on English and other foreign literatures make up a greater part of his works by volume than does his fiction.

Legacy
The main-belt asteroid 14846 Lampedusa is named after him.

On the occasion of the 14th edition of the Rome Film Festival, the docufilm Die Geburt des Leoparden, directed by Luigi Falorni, was screened. A journey to discover the life of the last Prince of Lampedusa told by the voices and testimonies of loved ones.

In 2019 Canadian novelist Steven Price published a novelized biography of Giuseppe Tomasi di Lampedusa entitled Lampedusa.

Titles 

His full title was:

Don Giuseppe Tomasi, 11th Prince of Lampedusa, 12th Duke of Palma, Baron of Montechiaro, Baron of La Torretta, and Grandee of Spain of the first class

References

Further reading
 Margareta Dumitrescu, Sulla parte VI del Gattopardo. La fortuna di Lampedusa in Romania, Giuseppe Maimone Editore, Catania, 2001.
 Gilmour, David (2007) The Last Leopard. A life of Giuseppe Tomasi di Lampedusa. Eland Publishing Ltd. .
 Gefen, Gérard (2001) Sicily, Land of the Leopard Princes. Tauris Parke.
 Giuseppe Leone, "Il Gattopardo orgoglio di un'isola, pregiudizio di una cultura – Il romanzo di Giuseppe Tomasi di Lampedusa fra caso letterario e revisionismo storico", Il punto stampa, Lecco, January 1997.
"Changing things so everything stays the same", The Economist, October 22, 1998.
 Biography of Giuseppe Tomasi di Lampedusa (1896–1957) on RAI International online
 "The Role of Leadership in the Novel The Leopard" (1958, Lampedusa)(After clicking on link, scroll down page)

External links

 

 
1896 births
1957 deaths
Italian historical novelists
Italian military personnel of World War I
Dukes of Italy
Grandees of Spain
Deaths from lung cancer in Lazio
Italian Roman Catholics
Italian male short story writers
Nobility from Palermo
Sicilian princes
Writers from Palermo
Strega Prize winners
Writers of historical fiction set in the modern age
20th-century Italian novelists
Italian male novelists
20th-century Italian short story writers
20th-century Italian male writers
Giuseppe